Bartłomiej Tomczak (born 7 September 1985 in Ostrów Wielkopolski) is a Polish team handball player, currently playing for Energa MKS Kalisz and on the Poland men's national handball team.

References

External links
 Player profile on Polish Handball Association  website
 Profile at Vive Targi Kielce official website

Polish male handball players
People from Ostrów Wielkopolski
1985 births
Living people
Sportspeople from Greater Poland Voivodeship
Vive Kielce players